Francis Campbell (20 April 1867 – 14 May 1929) was an Australian cricketer. He played one first-class match for Tasmania in 1894.

See also
 List of Tasmanian representative cricketers

References

External links
 

1867 births
1929 deaths
Australian cricketers
Tasmania cricketers
Cricketers from Hobart